Ferenc Rados (born 26 October 1934, in Budapest) is a Hungarian pianist and professor of piano and chamber music. Until 1996, he taught at the Franz Liszt Academy of Music in Budapest, Hungary. After retiring, he gave master classes in Europe and Asia. Rados was awarded the Kossuth Prize in 2010.

Notable students
 Kirill Gerstein (pianist)
 Søren Nils Eichberg (composer)
 András Fejér (cellist)
 Barnabás Kelemen (violinist)
 Zoltán Kocsis (pianist, conductor, composer)
 Matteo Marchisano-Adamo (composer, filmmaker)
 Dezső Ránki (pianist)
 András Schiff (pianist, conductor)
 Balázs Szokolay (pianist)
  (pianist)
 Andres Carciente (pianist)
 Miriam Gómez-Morán (pianist)
 Claudio Martínez-Mehner (pianist)
 SooJin Anjou (pianist)
 Aldo Mata Payero (cellist)
 Leonidas Kavakos (violinist, conductor)
Natsuki Fukasawa (pianist)

References

External links

Living people
1934 births
Hungarian pianists
Academic staff of the Franz Liszt Academy of Music
21st-century pianists
21st-century Hungarian male musicians